Prince Constantin Racoviţă (1699 – 28 January 1764) was twice monarch of Principality of Moldavia from Ottoman government: 31 August 1749 – 3 July 1753 and 29 February 1756 – 14 March 1757; and also twice of Muntenia: July 1753 – c. 28 February 1756 and 9 March 1763 – 28 January/8 February 1764. He struggled against the powerful boyars in Wallachia, exiling their leaders to Cyprus. Due to continued opposition he asked for a transfer to Moldavia.

He was the son of Mihai Racoviță and Ana Codreanu.

During his second Moldavian reign, Racoviță established the Church of the Prophet Samuel in Focșani.

References

1699 births
1764 deaths
Rulers of Moldavia
Rulers of Wallachia
Constantin
Rulers of Moldavia and Wallachia
Founders of Christian monasteries